, a merchant steamship lost in 1881
 , a ship of the Scandinavian American Line scrapped in 1935
 , a retired ocean liner built in 1951

See also
 , the name of several U.S. Navy ships